Class Wargames is a situationist ludic-science group based in London. Founded by Richard Barbrook and Fabian Tompsett in 2007, the group has since reproduced Guy Debord's Le Jeu de la Guerre and proceeded to tour Europe, Asia and South America. In contrast to the electronic version of Debord's game, created by the Radical Software Group, Class Wargames is based on a real rather than digital version of the Game of War and allows for convivial interaction through which anyone can become a situationist.

Meaningful Votes: The Brexit Simulation was a wargame designed by Richard Barbrook to help understand the dynamics of the political factions in United Kingdoms in regards to the Brexit referendum.

Publications
Barbrook, Richard (2014). Class Wargames: Ludic Subversion Against Spectacular Capitalism (paperback ed.). London: Minor Compositions. 
Barbrook, Richard and Tompsett, Fabian (2012) Class Wargames Presents Guy Debord's The Game of War (paperback ed.). London: Unpopular Books.
Lutschinger, Stefan (2014) (ed.) Klassenkampfspiele (paperback ed.). London: Unpopular Books.

References

Situationist International
Organizations established in 2007
Clubs and societies in London